Live in Verona is a DVD of a concert performed by the British band Jamiroquai in Verona in 2002, when the band toured in support of their album A Funk Odyssey.

Track listing 
 Twenty Zero One
 Canned Heat
 Bad Girls (Donna Summer cover)
 Corner of the Earth
 Virtual Insanity
 Little L
 High Times
 Cosmic Girl
 Main Vein – with Beverley Knight
 Deeper Underground
 Alright
 Love Foolosophy – with Beverley Knight

Personnel
Jason Kay – vocals
Matt Johnson – keyboards
Simon Carter – keyboards
Rob Harris – guitar, backing vocals
Nick Fyffe – bass guitar
Derrick McKenzie – drums
Sola Akingbola – percussion, backing vocals
Hazel Fernandez – backing vocals
Dee Lewis – backing vocals
Valerie Etienne – backing vocals

Charts

Weekly charts

Year-end charts

Certifications

References

Jamiroquai live albums
2002 live albums
Live video albums
2002 video albums
Jamiroquai video albums